Benedict is an unincorporated community in Lakeport Township, Hubbard County, Minnesota, United States.

The community is located along State Highway 200 (MN 200) near Laporte and Walker.  Benedict is five miles southeast of Laporte.

A post office called Benedict was established in 1907, and remained in operation until it was discontinued in 1995. The community was named for an early settler.

References

Unincorporated communities in Hubbard County, Minnesota
Unincorporated communities in Minnesota